Jacques A. Bailly (born January 28, 1966) is an American professor who has served as the Scripps National Spelling Bee's official pronouncer since 2003. He was the 1980 Scripps National Spelling Bee champion.

Early life and education 
Bailly grew up in the Denver, Colorado area. He began participating in spelling bees in sixth grade, training with a nun at his Catholic school. He reached the National Spelling Bee as an eighth grader and won with the word elucubrate.

Bailly studied Ancient Greek and Latin, receiving his bachelor's degree from Brown University and his PhD from Cornell University. He learned German in Switzerland with the help of a Fulbright scholarship. In 1990, he wrote a letter to the National Spelling Bee organizers offering his services and was hired as an associate pronouncer. Bailly became the Bee's chief pronouncer after Alex Cameron's death in 2003.

Career
Bailly works full-time as an associate professor of classics at the University of Vermont, specializing in Greek and Roman philosophy, particularly Plato.

Personal life

Bailly is married to Leslyn Hall. They have two children. He portrayed himself in the 2006 film Akeelah and the Bee, which focuses on a girl (played by Keke Palmer) who competes in the National Spelling Bee.

See also
List of Scripps National Spelling Bee champions

References

External links
 The Believer - Interview with Jacques Bailly June/July 2006
The Man Who Pronounced It All

The Kids Are A-L-R-I-G-H-T

American spellers
Spelling bee champions
American classical scholars
Classical scholars of the University of Vermont
Cornell University alumni
People from Denver
Brown University alumni
1966 births
Living people
Scripps National Spelling Bee
Scripps National Spelling Bee participants
American scholars of ancient Greek philosophy
Fulbright alumni